The list of University of Michigan Law School alumni includes notable alumni of University of Michigan Law School.

Alphabetized list

A-D

Ralph W. Aigler (J.D. 1907), expert on property; member of U-M faculty, 1910–1954; inducted into the University of Michigan Athletic Hall of Honor
Gideon Winans Allen (LAW 1864), Wisconsin State Assemblyman
Ronald J. Allen (J.D. 1973), Northwestern University John Henry Wigmore Professor of Law, one of only four Americans to be designated as a Yangtze River Scholar (China's highest academic award, formerly only for Nobel Laureates) in 2007; the first law professor to receive the award, which usually goes to scientists or economists
Justin Amash (J.D. 2005), U.S. congressman from Michigan from 2011 to 2021.
Edgardo Angara (LLM 1964), former president of the University of the Philippines; Senate President of the Philippines
George Ariyoshi (J.D. 1952), third governor of Hawaii (1974–1986) 
Susanne Baer (LLM 1993), elected to the German Federal Constitutional Court in February 2011
Melody Barnes (J.D. 1989), director of the President's Domestic Policy Council
Mitchell Berman, Professor of Law at the University of Pennsylvania Law School
Mary Frances Berry (J.D. 1970), former chairwoman of the United States Commission on Civil Rights; current professor of history at the University of Pennsylvania
Lester Bird (LLB 1959), Prime Minister of Antigua and Barbuda
Henry Bodenstab (LL.B. 1898), Wisconsin State Senator
Heidi Bond (J.D.), bestselling author of historical romance novels under the pseudonym Courtney Milan
Willard Lee Boyd (LAW: LL.M. 1952; S.J.D. 1962), president emeritus of The University of Iowa, and its 15th president; chairman of the Association of American Universities, 1979–1980
Steven G. Bradbury (J.D. 1988), former acting assistant attorney general (Office of Legal Counsel)
Charles Henry Brown, Speaker of the Vermont House of Representatives
John Robert Brown (J.D. 1932), Judge of the United States Court of Appeals for the Fifth Circuit, one of the "Fifth Circuit Four"
 Vernon A. Bullard (LL.B. 1884), United States Attorney for the District of Vermont
 William J. Bulow (LL.B. 1893), U.S. Senator from and Governor of South Dakota 
Rousseau Angelus Burch (1885), Justice of the Kansas Supreme Court 
Nicole (Niki) Burnham (J.D. 1994), author, RITA award winner
Clarence A. Buskirk, 10th Indiana Attorney General (1874–1878)
Michael T. Cahill (1996), Dean of Brooklyn Law School
David Francis Cargo (LLB 1957), Governor of New Mexico, 1967–71; New Mexico State House of Representatives Albuquerque (1963–67)
Roger Carter (LL.M., 1968), dean of University of Saskatchewan College of Law; recipient of Order of Canada.
Avern Cohn (J.D. 1949), Judge, United States District Court for the Eastern District of Michigan 
William W. Cook (JD 1882), heavily published and cited author of textbooks on corporate law; donor of the quadrangle to Michigan
Ann Coulter (J.D. 1988), political personality, author
Mike Cox (J.D. 1989), Michigan Attorney General, 2003–2010
Andrew Cray, LGBT rights activist and husband of Delaware state senator Sarah McBride
George Crockett Jr. (LAW: 1934), civil rights activist; helped found the National Lawyers Guild; first African American lawyer hired by the Department of Labor; Recorder's Court Judge, Detroit, Michigan, 1966–74; U.S. House of Representatives (D-Mich.), 1991 
Byron Mac Cutcheon (LL.B. 1866), American Civil War officer; Medal of Honor recipient; politician from Michigan 
Clarence Darrow (attended), trial lawyer; defense counsel in the Scopes Monkey Trial and Leopold and Loeb
Harry M. Daugherty (LL.B. 1880), United States Attorney General, 1921–24, Republican Party boss, member of the "Ohio Gang".
William R. Day (LL.B. 1870), United States Secretary of State, 1898; United States Supreme Court Associate Justice, 1903–1922
Pat DeWine (JD 1994), Associate Justice of the Ohio Supreme Court, 2017–
Donald McDonald Dickinson (LL.B. 1867), in 1887 appointed by Grover Cleveland as United States Postmaster General; served from January 6, 1888, until the end of Cleveland's first term in 1889
Gershwin A. Drain (J.D.), District Judge on the United States District Court for the Eastern District of Michigan
Mike Duggan (J.D. 1983), incumbent and 75th mayor of Detroit, Michigan, serving since 2013, and former deputy County Executive of Wayne County

E-G
David M. Ebel (J.D. 1965), Judge of the United States Court of Appeals for the Tenth Circuit 
Harry T. Edwards (J.D. 1965), former chief judge of the United States Court of Appeals for the District of Columbia Circuit 
Larry Elder (J.D. 1977), syndicated radio and television talk show host
Rossa Fanning (LL.M 2000), Attorney General of Ireland (2022–present)
John Feikens (J.D.), politician and judge from Michigan; Senior Judge, U.S. District Court for the Eastern District of Michigan (1986–present); was nominated to the same district court by three presidents 
Heidi Li Feldman (J.D. 1990), American law professor
Jeffrey L. Fisher (J.D. 1997), Stanford Law School professor; prevailing counsel in Crawford v. Washington and Blakely v. Washington
Harold Ford Jr. (J.D. 1996), former U.S. Representative from Tennessee; Democratic Leadership Council chair 
Ralph M. Freeman (LL.B. 1926), Judge, United States District Court for the Eastern District of Michigan
John J. Gardner (attended 1866–1867), U.S. Representative from New Jersey; mayor of Atlantic City 
Ralph F. Gates (J.D. 1917), 37th governor of Indiana 
Richard Gephardt (J.D. 1965), U.S. Representative from Missouri (1977–2005); House Majority Leader, 1989–1995; Minority Leader, 1995–2003
 Heather K. Gerken (J.D. 1994), 17th Dean of Yale Law School.
Charles E. Gibson Jr. (LL.B. 1952), Vermont Attorney General
Ernest Willard Gibson (attended 1898–99), United States Senator from Vermont
Arthur L. Gilliom (LL.B. 1913), 25th Indiana Attorney General (1925–1929)
Paul Gillmor (J.D. 1964), U.S. Representative from Ohio, 5th District; President of the Ohio Senate
Jay Gorney (LL.B. 1919), Tin Pan Alley songwriter who co-wrote "Brother, Can You Spare a Dime?;" blacklisted during McCarthy era
Ronald M. Gould (J.D. 1973), Judge, the United States Court of Appeals for the Ninth Circuit
Jim Graham (D.C. City Councilmember)
Chuck Greenberg (J.D. 1985), owner, CEO of the Texas Rangers
Wycliffe Grousbeck (J.D. 1986), owner of the Boston Celtics

H-K

Franklin D. Hale (LL.B. 1877), Vermont Auditor of Accounts, and longtime U.S. Consul in several locations
Seneca Haselton (LL.B. 1875), mayor of Burlington, Vermont, U.S. Minister to Venezuela, Associate Justice of the Vermont Supreme Court
Kirby Hendee (LL.B. 1953), Wisconsin State Senator
J. Lister Hill (attended), former U.S. Senator from Alabama 
James P. Hoffa (LL.B. 1966), president, International Brotherhood of Teamsters
Vice Admiral James W. Houck (J.D. 1985), Judge Advocate General of the United States Navy
Harland Bradley Howe (LL.B. 1894), United States District Court for the District of Vermont
Wilbur E. Hurlbut (LL.B. 1893), Wisconsin State Assemblyman
Bela S. Huntington (attended 1882–83), member of the Oregon House of Representatives
Sada Jacobson (J.D. 2011), Olympic fencing silver and bronze medalist
Valerie Jarrett (J.D. 1981), senior advisor to President Obama
Christopher M. Jeffries (J.D. 1974), real estate developer and namesake of Jeffries Hall
Robert M. Johnson (J.D. 1971), former publisher of Newsday 
Matthew M. Joyce, United States federal judge
Amalya Lyle Kearse (J.D. 1962), Judge, United States Court of Appeals for the Second Circuit 
Paul S. Kemp (J.D. 2000), fantasy author, known for Forgotten Realms novels; defender of shared world fiction; his novel Deceived (2011) was on the New York Times best-seller list
Cornelia Groefsema Kennedy (J.D. 1947), Senior Judge, United States Court of Appeals for the Sixth Circuit 
Raymond Kethledge (J.D. 1993), Judge, United States Court of Appeals for the Sixth Circuit
John Knauf (1892), justice of the North Dakota Supreme Court

L-Q

Swift Lathers, founder of The Mears Newz newspaper
Cary D. Landis (LL.B., 1899), 25th Florida Attorney General, (1931–1938)
Eric Lefkofsky (J.D. 1993), serial entrepreneur; co-founder of and angel investor in Groupon; president of private equity and consulting firm Blue Media, LLC; named to Forbes 2011 list of billionaires
Jeffrey Lehman (J.D. 1981), 11th President of Cornell
Brian Leiter (J.D. 1987), professor, University of Chicago
U. S. Lesh (LL.B., 1891), 24th Indiana Attorney General (1921–1925)
Jason Levien (J.D. 1997), co-owner of the Major League Soccer club D.C. United and Welsh club Swansea City A.F.C.
Tom Lewand (J.D. 1996), president of the Detroit Lions
Peter Maassen (J.D.), appointed by Governor Sean Parnell to the Alaska Supreme Court; the 22nd justice appointed to the Court
E.W. Marland (LL.B., 1893), oilman; U.S. Congressman; Oklahoma governor
 J. Thomas McCarthy (J.D. 1963), author of McCarthy's Treatise on Trademark and Unfair Competition
 Francis McNulty Jr. (LL.B. 1888), Republican member of the Iowa House of Representatives from 1896 to 1898
Charles Edward Merrill (1906–1907), co-founded stock brokerage firm Merrill Lynch with Edmund C. Lynch; worked at Merrill Lynch, 1914–56
Charles W. Miller (1884), 18th Indiana Attorney General (1903–1907)
Robert E. Minahan (LL.B. 1894), Mayor of Green Bay, Wisconsin
Jeffrey P. Minear (J.D. 1982), Counselor to Chief Justice John G. Roberts Jr.
Frank Murphy (LL.B. 1914), United States Attorney General, 1939; United States Supreme Court Associate Justice, 1940–1949 
Gordon Myse (LL.B. 1960), Judge of the Wisconsin Court of Appeals
Harry Nelson, author
John R. Nolon (J.D. 1966), Distinguished Professor of Law Emeritus at the Elisabeth Haub School of Law at Pace University, author, Fulbright Scholar, Environmental Law Specialist
Helen W. Nies (L.L.B. 1948), Chief Judge of the United States Court of Appeals for the Federal Circuit, 1990–1994
Ronald L. Olson (J.D. 1967), attorney and name partner in the Los Angeles office of the law firm of Munger Tolles & Olson LLP
Kevyn Orr (J.D. 1983), partner with Jones Day LLP and emergency financial manager of the city of Detroit, Michigan from 2013 to 2014
Rob Pelinka (J.D. 1996), general manager of Los Angeles Lakers; former sports agent, known for representing Kobe Bryant
Frank Plumley (attended 1867–68), United States Congressman from Vermont
Mark F. Pomerantz (J.D. 1975), New York attorney
Lloyd Welch Pogue (J.D.), pioneering aviation attorney; chairman of the now-defunct Civil Aeronautics Board
John Porter (J.D. 1961), United States Representative from Illinois, 1980–2001
Rob Portman (J.D. 1984), director of the Office of Management and Budget; United States Senator from Ohio

R-Z

Luis María Ramírez Boettner (J.D. 1944), Minister of Foreign Affairs of Paraguay, 1993–1996
Clark T Randt Jr. (J.D. 1975), United States ambassador to China (2001–2009)
Nicholas Ranjan (J.D. 2003), District Judge for the United States District Court for the Western District of Pennsylvania
Branch Rickey (LL.B. 1911), Major League Baseball executive and Hall of Famer; created the modern minor league system and signed Jackie Robinson to a contract, breaking the sport's 20th-century color line
Richard Riordan (J.D. 1956), Mayor of Los Angeles, 1993–2001
John M. Rogers (J.D. 1974), Judge, United States Court of Appeals for the Sixth Circuit 
Marvin B. Rosenberry (J.D. 1893), Chief Justice of the Wisconsin Supreme Court
Donald Stuart Russell, U.S. Senator from South Carolina, 1965–1966; 107th Governor of South Carolina, 1963–1965 
Ken Salazar (J.D. 1981), former U.S. Senator from Colorado; former United States Secretary of the Interior 
Miriam Defensor Santiago (LL.M. 1975, S.J.D. 1976), member of the Senate of the Philippines; Judge of the International Criminal Court 
Joseph Francis Sartori 1881, founder and president, Security First-National Bank, co-founder, president, Los Angeles Country Club
Anthony Joseph Scirica (J.D. 1965), chief judge, United States Court of Appeals for the Third Circuit
Robert E. Scott (S.J.D. 1973), bankruptcy scholar and professor at Columbia Law School
Carol Sanger (J.D. 1976), reproductive rights expert, professor at Columbia Law School
Theary Seng, Cambodian-American human-rights activist and lawyer
Ma. Lourdes Aranal Sereno (LL.M. 1993), Filipino jurist, lawyer and law professor; former Chief Justice of the Supreme Court of the Philippines
Myra C. Selby (J.D. 1977), first female and first African American Justice on the Indiana Supreme Court.
Keith A. Shandalow (J.D. 1986), Administrative Law Judge, Colorado
Cynthia Leitich Smith (J.D. 1994), author
Rick Snyder (J.D. 1982), former CEO of Gateway; former Governor of Michigan 
George Alexander Spater (J.D. 1933), chairman of American Airlines, 1968–1973
Oliver Lyman Spaulding (LL.B., 1896), U.S. Army brigadier general
 Robert Stafford, US congressman and senator; 71st Governor of Vermont
Bert Sugar (J.D. 1961) author of more than 80 books; editor and publisher of The Ring, a magazine devoted to boxing (his daughter Jennifer attended Michigan as an undergrad).
George Sutherland (attended 1891), United States Supreme Court Justice 
Kent D. Syverud (J.D. 1981), dean of the Washington University School of Law
Masaaki Tanaka (LL.M), president and chief executive officer of UnionBanCal Corporation and its principal subsidiary, Union Bank of California
Daniel Tarullo (J.D. 1977), member of Board of Governors of the United States Federal Reserve Board since January 28, 2009
Hobart Taylor Jr., executive vice chairman of the President's Committee on Equal Employment Opportunities, Special Counsel to President Lyndon Johnson, and director of the Export–Import Bank of the United States. First African American editor of the Michigan Law Review.
Arn Tellem (J.D.), sports agent; former columnist for The New York Times
Larry Dean Thompson (J.D.), lawyer; deputy Attorney General of the United States under United States President George W. Bush until August 2003 
William Wheeler Thornton (LL.B. 1876), judge; author; Indiana Deputy Attorney General; Indiana State Supreme Ct. Librarian
Norman O. Tietjens (J.D. 1930) – judge of the United States Tax Court<ref name="Memorial">United States Tax Court, "Memorial Proceedings for the Honorable Norman O. Tietjens, Judge, United States Tax Court, Reports of the Tax Court of the United States, Vol. 81, p. iii–xxi.</ref>
John D. Voelker (JD 1928), justice of the Michigan Supreme Court; author of Anatomy of a Murder''
John M. Walker Jr. (J.D. 1966), former Chief Judge, United States Court of Appeals for the Second Circuit 
Moses Fleetwood Walker (attended 1881–1882), baseball player and author; first African-American to play major league professional baseball
Johnnie Mac Walters, former Commissioner of Internal Revenue
Albert D. Walton (LL.B. 1907), former US Attorney for the district of Wyoming
James Franklin Ware, Wisconsin State Assemblyman and Senator
Charles W. Waterman (LL.B. 1889), U.S. Senator from Colorado
Walter W. Wensinger (LL.B. 1917), highly decorated lieutenant general in the Marine Corps during World War II.
Sarah Killgore Wertman (LL.B. 1871), née Sarah Killgore, the first woman to be admitted to the bar of any US state
David Westin (J.D. 1977), president of ABC News
Mary Collins Whiting (1835–1912), lawyer, business woman, teacher
James J. White (J.D. 1962), Robert A. Sullivan Professor of Law at Michigan Law; expert on the Uniform Commercial Code
G. Mennen Williams (J.D. 1936), 41st Governor of Michigan and the Assistant Secretary of State for African Affairs under President John F. Kennedy
Ralph Wilson, owner, Buffalo Bills
Bob Woodruff (J.D. 1987), journalist; ABC News anchor
Frank Wu, dean of University of California, Hastings College of the Law
John C.H. Wu (J.D. 1928), principal author of the constitution of the Republic of China
Sam Zell (LSA B.A. 1963; J.D. 1966), land developer; founder of EQ Office; former National Association of Real Estate Investment Trusts chairman; current chairman and majority owner of the Tribune Company

See also
University of Michigan Law School

References

External links

List
University of Michigan Law School